Quoth may refer to:
 Quoth (Discworld), a talking raven in the Discworld series of novels by Terry Pratchett
 Quoth (EP), the EP  musical release by Polygon Window (Aphex Twin)